Nanyin is a town in Yuanshi County, Hebei province, China. , it has 17 villages under its administration: 
Nanyinyijie Village
Nanyinerjie Village
Nanyinsanjie Village
Nanyinsijie  Village
Nanyinzhuang Village
Jia Village
Tongmeilü Village
Meng Village
Beifan Village
Nanfan Village
Chugu Village
Dongpu Village
Niufangzhuang Village
Zhaopu Village
Dongdu Village
Xidu Village
Beidu Village

See also 
 List of township-level divisions of Hebei

References 

Township-level divisions of Hebei
Yuanshi County